This is a list of Kansas State Wildcats football players drafted into the National Football League (NFL) and American Football League (AFL).  Kansas State has had a total of 150 players selected – including five players taken in the first round – from the first NFL Draft in 1936 through the 2022 NFL Draft. Kansas State had a streak of having at least one player drafted into the NFL for 26 consecutive years (1994–2019), until it ended in 2020.

After the NFL merged with the AFL in 1966, the history of the AFL was officially adopted by the NFL and therefore this list includes players taken in the AFL Draft (1960–1966) and in the Common Draft (1967–1969) in addition to the NFL Draft.  Once the AFL officially merged with the NFL in 1970, the "Common Draft" simply became the NFL Draft. Because four KSU players were selected in both the NFL and AFL drafts, the total number of selections listed below is 151 (including one "redshirt" selection in the 1965 AFL Draft), through the 2019 draft.

Each NFL franchise seeks to add new players through the annual NFL Draft. The draft rules were last updated in 2009. The team with the worst record the previous year picks first, the next-worst team second, and so on. Teams that did not make the playoffs are ordered by their regular-season record with any remaining ties broken by strength of schedule. Playoff participants are sequenced after non-playoff teams, based on their round of elimination (wild card, division, conference, and Super Bowl).



Key

Selections

Notable undrafted players
A selection of notable KSU football players who entered the NFL outside the draft includes:
 Bert Pearson entered the NFL in 1929, before the draft began.  In an eight-year career with the Chicago Bears he was part of two NFL championship teams.
 Doug Russell entered the NFL in 1934, before the draft began.  He led the league in rushing in the 1935 NFL season, playing for the Chicago Cardinals.
 Paul Coffman entered the NFL as an undrafted free agent in 1978.  He earned three Pro Bowl appearances during his career and is in the Green Bay Packers Hall of Fame.
 Damian Johnson entered the NFL as an undrafted free agent in 1986 and played for the New York Giants' Super Bowl XXI-winning team.
 Kendyl Jacox entered the NFL as an undrafted free agent in 1998.  He had a nine-year NFL career, starting 93 games on the offensive line.
 Ryan Lilja entered the NFL as an undrafted free agent in 2004. He had an eight-year NFL career, starting in 104 games on the offensive line and playing for the Indianapolis Colts Super Bowl XLI winning team.
 Byron Pringle entered the NFL as an undrafted free agent in 2018. He currently plays for the Chicago Bears and played for the Kansas City Chiefs Super Bowl LIV winning team.

Nine KSU players were selected by other leagues directly challenging the NFL: two were drafted in the 1948 All-America Football Conference draft (Rollin Prather and Mike Zeleznek), two were selected in the 1983 USFL Draft (Amos Donaldson and Will Cokeley), three were selected in the 1984 USFL Draft (Reggie Singletary, L. E. Madison and Eric Mack), and two more in the 1985 USFL Draft (Eric Bailey and Kyle Clawson).  Many of these players also played in the NFL.

See also

 List of Kansas State University people

References

Kansas State Wildcats

Kansas State Wildcats NFL Draft